Crocker is an unincorporated community in Polk County in the U.S. state of Iowa.

History
Crocker was platted in 1880. The community took its name from Crocker Township, Iowa.

A post office was established at Crocker in 1882, and remained in operation until it was discontinued in 1918. Crocker's population was 48 in 1902, and 50 in 1925.

References

Unincorporated communities in Polk County, Iowa
1880 establishments in Iowa
Populated places established in 1880
Unincorporated communities in Iowa